Rocket Bar (1951–1970) was a registered Thoroughbred stallion that made his mark on the Quarter Horse racetracks and as a breeding stallion.

Life

Rocket Bar was a registered Thoroughbred son of Three Bars that foaled in Arizona in 1951. He raced until 1958, when he was sold and started a career in the breeding shed.

Racing career 
On the Quarter Horse tracks, Rocket Bar started once and came in third. He reached an AA speed rating in that one start, earning him a Race Register of Merit with the American Quarter Horse Association (or AQHA). On the Thoroughbred tracks, he started 35 times in six years. From those starts, he won 16 times, came in second 6 times and was third 4 times. He earned a total of $22,904.00 and won the 1956 and 1957 Phoenix Gold Cup Handicap.]

Breeding record 
During Rocket Bar's breeding career, he sired  AQHA Supreme Champions Fire Rocket, He Rocket, and Sugar Rocket along with other notable horses including Rocket Wrangler, Osage Rocket, Mr Tinky Bar, and Top Rockette.

Death and honors 
Rocket Bar died on October 23, 1970, after colic surgery.

Rocket Bar was inducted into the AQHA Hall of Fame in 1992.

Pedigree

Notes

References

 All Breed Pedigree Database Pedigree of Rocket Bar accessed on June 23, 2007
 AQHA Hall of Fame accessed on September 2, 2017

External links
 Rocket Bar at Quarter Horse Directory
 Rocket Bar at Quarter Horse Legends

Thoroughbred family 1-o
Racehorses bred in Arizona
Racehorses trained in the United States
American Quarter Horse sires
1951 racehorse births
1970 racehorse deaths
AQHA Hall of Fame (horses)